Guillaume Moullec (born March 7, 1980 in Brest) is a French former professional footballer who played as a right midfielder or right back.

References
 
 

1980 births
Living people
Sportspeople from Brest, France
French footballers
Association football defenders
Association football midfielders
FC Lorient players
Montpellier HSC players
FC Nantes players
Clermont Foot players
USJA Carquefou players
Ligue 1 players
Ligue 2 players
Championnat National players
Footballers from Brittany
Brittany international footballers